Dublin Duck Dispensary was the bedroom pop solo project of Irish musician Bobby Aherne.

He released two albums and two EPs on Netherlands-based netlabel Rack and Ruin Records. He also released an album on tape, and 2 EPs on 3" CD. Because of the basic lo-fi recording methods employed, Aherne's sound is often referred to as "noise pop" and "bedroom indie rock".

The band made its live debut at Hard Working Class Heroes 2008, and also played shows alongside Health, Wavves, So Cow, Ariel Pink and Grand Pocket Orchestra.

Aherne now records and tours under the name No Monster Club

Discography

Albums
 acupofteaandasliceofcake (2007)
 Luanqibazao (2008)
 Antique Beach Resort (2009)

Singles/EPs
 The Viking Disco (2006)
 All Free Today (2007)
 He do the Police in Different Voices (2008)
 Yykes Basket (2009)

Compilation Appearances
 Rack And Ruin Records: 100 (track: Bible Stories)
 Racking Around The Christmas Tree (track: Christmas Thesis)
 Never Mind The Brollies (track: Summer RW)

References

External links
Dublin Duck Dispensary on myspace
Rack and Ruin Records
Analogue Magazine interview

Irish indie pop groups
Musical groups from County Dublin